Nurnisa Abbas is a Uyghur musician known for Uyghur opera music. She also currently serves as a judge on the reality talent show The Voice of the Silk Road.

References

Uyghur music
Year of birth missing (living people)
Living people
Uyghur people
21st-century Chinese women singers